Walter Spencer Robertson (1893–1970) was United States Assistant Secretary of State for Far Eastern Affairs from April 8, 1953, until June 30, 1959.

References

1893 births
1970 deaths
United States Assistant Secretaries of State